"Every Teardrop Is a Waterfall" is a song by British rock band Coldplay, it was released as the lead single for their fifth studio album Mylo Xyloto on 3 June 2011. An exclusive digital EP version of it, with the B-sides "Major Minus" and "Moving to Mars", came out in the following weeks, being considered the band's eighth extended play. The track contains elements of the 1976 song "I Go to Rio" written by Peter Allen and Adrienne Anderson. It debuted at number 29 on the Billboard Hot 100 in the United States, selling 85,000 copies in its first week before climbing to its peak of number 14. On the UK Singles Chart, the song peaked at number 6. 

Its radio debut happened on BBC Radio 1, BBC Radio 2, BBC 6 Music, Absolute Radio, and Xfm. Coldplay first performed the song live on 4 June at the Rock am Ring and Rock im Park festival in Nürnberg, Germany. They also played it at the Steve Jobs memorial event at Apple headquarters on 19 October 2011 in Cupertino, California, and at the opening of the MTV European Music Awards in Belfast, Northern Ireland on 6 November 2011.

The track was used as the theme for the live-action film adaptation of Chūya Koyama's Uchū Kyōdai (Space Brothers) manga and scored two nominations at the 54th Grammy Awards, one for Best Rock Performance and the other for Best Rock Song.

Inspiration
When the song was first released on Coldplay's YouTube channel, it sparked many negative comments in the comment section, saying the song was plagiarised from "Ritmo de la noche" by 1990s-era German group Chocolate, or from Peter Allen's "I Go to Rio". However, upon release of the song, the line "Every Teardrop Is A Waterfall contains elements of I Go To Rio written by Peter Allen and Adrienne Anderson" was noted below the official lyrics to the song on Coldplay's website.
The Oracle (Coldplay's web site Question and Answer section) responded on 9 June 2011 to a question raised concerning its inspiration and collaboration:
I don't think people are quite understanding the song's composition. To clarify: Chris was inspired to write Every Teardrop Is A Waterfall after hearing some chords in a nightclub scene in Alejandro González Iñárritu's film Biutiful (2010). The chords in the film are part of a track that is based on I Go To Rio written by Peter Allen and Adrienne Anderson, released by Peter Allen in 1976. If you look at a clip on YouTube you'll hear the chords for yourself. As for other people asking if Ritmo de la Noche by The Sacados should also be credited the answer is "no". Firstly, that is a cover of Chocolate's song by the same name who sampled I Go To Rio. Secondly, they both came later in 1990 so hopefully they should have credited Peter & Adrienne.

This is not the first time that Coldplay have used samples to write a new song, having used a Kraftwerk motif for their X&Y single "Talk".

Critical reception
"Every Teardrop Is a Waterfall" received generally positive reviews from critics. The Boston Herald gave a positive review, saying "Chris Martin does it again. He gives force to wimp music, beauty to base pop and the world another Coldplay anthem. Basically, the boys are joyous, and so is this stadium-rock track. 'I turn the music up, I got my records on, I shut the world outside until the lights come on' Martin sings over buoyant synths, ringing guitar and big drums. You can feel the love and hear the band's next chart-topper all at once."

Rolling Stone gave the song a three and a half stars rating out of five commenting "Chris Martin says Coldplay's upcoming album is influenced by old-school New York graffiti, and in a recent photo the bandmates are dressed in neon chillwear like they just walked off the set of Breakin' 3: A Brit-Pop Odyssey. But the first single doesn't go for the sound of early hip-hop so much as its sense of year-zero possibility. Over a rave-tinged keyboard melody, leavened by producer Brian Eno's rainforest-of-the-soul ambiance, Martin sings of kids dancing until morning and heaven inside his headphones. When the drums kick in fully, it moves like "Sunday Bloody Sunday" by way of the Velvets' "Sunday Morning," a flag-waving ode to change-as-inspiration: "I'd rather be a comma than a full stop," Martin sings. Coming from a guy whose critics take him for a human exclamation point, it's a welcome sentiment."

MTV praised the song, stating "Modern rock behemoths Coldplay just previewed the first single off their upcoming Brian Eno-produced fifth studio album, and it's every bit as soaring as we've come to expect from the band." and finished up saying "In any case, "Every Teardrop Is A Waterfall" has major summer smash potential, so teary waterfalls, be gone, Coldplay!"

Bill Lamb of About.com gave the song a four stars rating out of five explaining "The overall effect of this song is Coldplay moving forward into new explorations while keeping the elements that endear them to their fans wholly intact. 'Every Teardrop Is a Waterfall' is unlikely to be hailed as an instant classic to match the very best of Coldplay's past work, but a strong argument could be made that the band has never released their best material as the first single from any of their albums". PopMatters named the song one of the best of the year. In 2019, Rolling Stone included the track on their "100 Best Songs of the 2010s" list at number 100.

Music video

The video was released to the public on 28 June 2011. It shows the band playing across various backdrops sprayed with colourful graffiti painted by the band's artist "Paris". The video was shot between 14 and 15 June 2011 at Millennium Mills in east London, close to London City Airport, but begins with a shot of the Downtown Los Angeles skyline. The music video, which features the band, uses a stop motion technique and was directed by Mat Whitecross, who has worked with the band since 1999 and was responsible for the videos for "Lovers in Japan" and "Christmas Lights", among others. The video was edited by Nick Allix of The Whitehouse Post based in London Soho.

The video received positive reviews by critics who noted its colourful visual. Rolling Stone said: "The vibrant, colorful clip is well-suited to the song, which has a shaky, excited energy and the sort of optimistic, romantic lyrics that have made Coldplay one of the world's most crowd-pleasing rock bands". The New York Post wrote "the clip proves that the boys are just as interested in pushing boundaries with their videos as they are with their music."

Covers and remixes
Swedish singer Robyn covered the song in July 2011. The Swedish House Mafia played their remix during many of their shows during 2011 and 2012; the remix was well received by most critics and fans. It was included on the Swedish House Mafia's album, Until Now, with the artist's name listed as 'Coldplay vs. Swedish House Mafia' with the title as in the original, rather than putting on a remix credit. The song has also been remixed by Swedish DJ Avicii.

Track listing

Credits and personnel
Guy Berryman – bass guitar, backing vocals, keyboards, songwriter
Jonny Buckland – electric guitar, backing vocals, songwriter
Will Champion – backing vocals, acoustic guitar, drums, songwriter
Chris Martin – lead vocals, acoustic guitar, songwriter
Peter Allen – songwriter
Adrienne Anderson – songwriter
Markus Dravs – producer
Daniel Green – producer and mixing
Rik Simpson – producer and mixing
Mark 'Spike' Stent – mixing
Davide Rossi – strings
Jon Hopkins – additional programming
Brian Eno – "enoxification" and additional composition

Source:

Charts and certifications

Weekly charts

Year-end charts

Certifications

Release history

References

External links
 Official website

2011 EPs
2011 singles
2011 songs
Coldplay EPs
Coldplay songs
Number-one singles in Iceland
Parlophone EPs
Sampling controversies
Song recordings produced by Markus Dravs
Song recordings produced by Rik Simpson
Songs about music
Songs written by Peter Allen (musician)
Songs written by Adrienne Anderson
Songs written by Guy Berryman
Songs written by Jonny Buckland
Songs written by Will Champion
Songs written by Alex Christensen
Songs written by Brian Eno
Songs written by Chris Martin
Music videos directed by Mat Whitecross